Wu Yin (born 1988) is a Chinese team handball player. She plays on the Chinese national team, and participated at the 2011 World Women's Handball Championship in Brazil.

References

1988 births
Living people
Chinese female handball players
Handball players at the 2014 Asian Games
Handball players at the 2018 Asian Games
Asian Games silver medalists for China
Asian Games medalists in handball
Medalists at the 2018 Asian Games